Marvin E. Babbitt (August 14, 1902 – March 2, 1981) was an American politician from Wisconsin, who served as a Republican member of the Wisconsin State Assembly.

Biography
Babbitt was born on August 14, 1902, in Seymour, Wisconsin. He later served in the United States Army and became president of the local Kiwanis chapter.  Babbitt died March 2, 1981, in Rice County, Minnesota and is buried at Seymour Cemetery in Seymour, Wisconsin.

Political career
Babbitt was elected to the Wisconsin State Assembly in 1960. Additionally, he was a member of the county board.

Notes

People from Seymour, Wisconsin
Republican Party members of the Wisconsin State Assembly
County supervisors in Wisconsin
Military personnel from Wisconsin
United States Army soldiers
1902 births
1981 deaths
20th-century American politicians